Ali Attoui (born January 21, 1942 in Annaba) is a retired Algerian international football player.

Career
Attoui spent the majority of his career with Hamra Annaba, with brief stints with AS Bône, and JBAC Bône. He also represented Algeria at the 1968 African Cup of Nations.

Honours
 Won the Algerian Cup one with Hamra Annaba in 1972

References

External links
 
 

1942 births
Footballers at the 1965 All-Africa Games
African Games competitors for Algeria
Competitors at the 1967 Mediterranean Games
Mediterranean Games competitors for Algeria
1968 African Cup of Nations players
Living people
People from Annaba
Algerian footballers
Algeria international footballers
Hamra Annaba players
Association football defenders
21st-century Algerian people
20th-century Algerian people